"Call Me the Breeze" is a rock song by J. J. Cale. It first appeared on his 1972 debut album, Naturally, as the opening track. The song consists of a 12-bar blues guitar shuffle and features the early use of a drum machine.

Lynyrd Skynyrd version

Like many Cale songs, "Call Me the Breeze" has been covered numerous times by an assortment of musicians, most notably Lynyrd Skynyrd on their albums Second Helping (1974) and the live disc One More from the Road (1976), Mason Proffit on their 1972 album Rockfish Crossing, Bobby Bare on his album Bobby Bare - The Country Store Collection (1988), Johnny Cash on his album Water from the Wells of Home (1988) with his son John Carter Cash, John Mayer on his 2013 album Paradise Valley, and UK singer Alan Price on his 1977 album Two of a Kind with Rob Hoeke. Many of the cover versions available have been performed as tributes to Lynyrd Skynyrd. For example, Les Claypool covers it on his album Under The Influence, A Jam Band Tribute to Lynyrd Skynyrd.

Eric Clapton's adaptation

Performance and release
JJ Cale performed the song along with his longtime friend Eric Clapton, at Clapton's 2004 Crossroads Guitar Festival. The version, featuring an extended guitar solo by Clapton, is included on the official Crossroads DVD released in late 2004. Later, when Clapton got the news that Cale had died, he performed various tunes composed by JJ Cale for his 2013 Baloise Session concert, dedicating his performance to Cale. For his 2014 tribute-album to JJ Cale, titled The Breeze: An Appreciation of JJ Cale, Clapton covered the song with the original drum machine sound at the beginning, saying it's not possible to really cover Cale's work: "You can hear the drum machine and JJ rambling at the beginning there". His take on the song was released under the title "They Call Me the Breeze" as a promotional single on June 30, 2014 for Surfdog and Polydor Records, accessible via digital music download.

Music video
On June 6, 2014, Clapton's management published the official lyric video with licence to Warner Bros. Records on his YouTube channel, before the album's release. Twenty days later the official music video was released and was directed by Joseph Toman. It features original photographic and videographic material of both Cale, and Clapton with Cale. The video opens with Clapton, hitchhiking with his guitar case in a rural location, holding a sign for Escondido, mimicking the cover art of the duo's album, The Road to Escondido. He is picked up by a car. The car footage is interspersed with Clapton who is seen singing and playing the song on a guitar given to him by Cale in 2006. The video shows Cale enjoying the classic American lifestyle. While driving around, Clapton chats to the driver, portrayed by English actor and director Dexter Fletcher about Cale, explaining that he wants to visit Escondido because an "old mate used to live there". Clapton pays tribute to Cale saying "he was a fantastic guy and a great musician ... he was my hero." The video ends with a shot of Clapton congratulating Cale after their performance at the 2004 Crossroads Guitar Festival in Dallas.

Weekly charts

Johnny Cash's version

References

J. J. Cale songs
Songs written by J. J. Cale
1970 songs
Lynyrd Skynyrd songs
Eric Clapton songs
Polydor Records singles
2014 singles